was a town located in Minaminaka District, Miyazaki, Japan.

As of 2003, the town had an estimated population of 11,845 and the density of 187.51 persons per km². The total area was 63.17 km².

On March 30, 2009, Nangō, along with the town of Kitagō (also from Minaminaka District), was merged into the expanded city of Nichinan. Minaminaka District was dissolved as a result of this merger.

Nango literally means "south shire". The town is in the southern part of the former Obi Shire, Himuka.

History
The town was established as a village in 1889 by merging the villages of Taninokuchi, Wakimoto, Katagami, Nienami, Tsuyano and Nakamura; which was later elevated to town status in 1940.

References

External links
 Nichinan official website 

Dissolved municipalities of Miyazaki Prefecture